Thihapate of Sagaing (also Minbyauk Thihapate, ; 1305–1364) king of Sagaing from 1352 to 1364. He came to power by being married to the powerful Princess Soe Min Kodawgyi. He led Sagaing during the most tumultuous period of the kingdom (1356−64). Despite a brief period of alliance with Pinya (1357−59), Sagaing had to face near-annual raids by the northern Shan state of Mong Mao (Maw) on its own. He lost power in April 1364 when Maw Shan forces sacked Sagaing. He escaped capture but was soon put to death by his stepson Thado Minbya at Kya-Khat-Wa-Ya, south of Sagaing.

Early life
Little is known about his early life or ancestry except that he was a grandson of the elder sister of Queen Pwa Saw of Pagan. This means that he was a grandson of Queen Yadanabon and King Narathihapate of Pagan. Since his father was a minister at the Sagaing court, Thihapate likely entered the service of Sagaing monarchs. Then in late 1351/early 1352, he married a recently widowed Princess Soe Min, daughter of the founder of the kingdom Saw Yun. It is unclear if his marriage to Soe Min preceded the death of Soe Min's brother King Tarabya II, who died at age 25 in February 1352 and left no heirs apparent to take over the throne. With no heirs apparent ready to take over, the court elected Thihapate king (or regent). His marriage to Soe Min may have been part of the election process.

Reign
His early reign was relatively peaceful. He continued Tarabya II's policy of peace with the cross-river rival Pinya. However, it was the calm before the storm. By 1355, the northern Shan state of Mong Mao had essentially achieved independence from the Mongols, and begun to look southward for expansion. In the next dry season 1356−57, Shan troops raided northern Sagaing territory. While Sagaing defenses held this time, Thihapate and Soe Min appeared to have recognized the eminent danger posed by the determined foe. They sought a closer alliance with Pinya. In 1357/58, they sent Princess Shin Saw Gyi, Soe Min's eldest daughter and Thihapate's stepdaughter, to King Kyawswa II of Pinya in a marriage of state.

The alliance yielded no discernible benefit. Kyawswa II, who did not control much beyond the core Kyaukse capital region, simply did not have enough manpower to assist Sagaing and hold his southern vassals at the same time. When the next Shan raids came in 1358−59, Pinya's southern vassal Toungoo (Taungoo) promptly revolted, and raided Pinya from the south. This allowed the Shan forces to overrun Sagaing and Pinya territories from the north. Kyawswa II died during the raids in March 1359. So devastating were the raids that Pinya's new king Narathu withdrew from the alliance.

Sagaing now faced the Shan threat on its own. In 1360/61, Thihapate appointed his eldest stepchild Thado Minbya governor of Tagaung, the northernmost Sagaing territory. But the teenage prince could do little to stem the raids. The Shan raiders not only overran Tagaung but also penetrated as far south as Pinya in 1362–63. Subsequently, Pinya pursued an alliance with Mong Mao, and the two states agreed to a joint attack on Sagaing. In the following dry season, Shan forces again overran Tagaung, and Thado Minbya barely escaped. At Sagaing, Thihapate was furious at Thado Minbya for the latter's failure to defend Tagaung. He did not accept Thado Minbya warning that the season's raid was far larger, and sent his stepson to prison at Kya-Khat-Wa-Ya, south of Sagaing.

Thihapate had expected another round of raids through the countryside but not a siege to the capital itself. He was surprised when the Shan forces laid siege to Sagaing on three sides. Pinya blockaded the port although the blockade was porous. In April 1364, Shan forces broke through, and entered the city. While panicked people of Sagaing crossed the Irrawaddy toward Pinya, Thihapate and the royal family slipped away by boat to Kya-Khat-Wa-Ya. But at Kya-Khat-Wa-Ya, Thado Minbya was waiting for him. The prince, who had been freed from prison by court officials allied with him, ordered the execution of his stepfather, and seized the throne.

Chronicle reporting differences
The royal chronicles do not agree on his birth and death dates.

Notes

References

Bibliography
 
 
 
 
 
 
 

Sagaing dynasty
1364 deaths
1305 births
14th-century Burmese monarchs